Perth Motorplex is a motorsport venue located at Kwinana Beach, Western Australia. It caters mainly for drag racing and speedway, although other events are held there regularly. Over 275,000 patrons attend the venue each year to many varied events. The Perth Motorplex holds rounds of the World Series Sprintcars championship.

History
Perth Motorplex (formerly Quit Motorplex) opened in 2000. It replaced the Claremont Speedway which was run at the Claremont Showground from 1927, and the Ravenswood Raceway Drag Racing strip. Many Claremont loyalists were unhappy with the change saying it destroyed almost 75 years of heritage as were many Ravenswood fans. Nonetheless, the changes suited a growing population in Perth as the racetrack at Claremont was situated literally across the road from housing estates. Also, the owners of the Showgrounds, the Royal Agricultural Society of Western Australia, while not wishing to lose their long time tenant, wanted to re-develop the main arena, which doubled as the speedway, into a fully grassed oval suitable for the Perth Royal Show and other outdoor festivals and concerts as well as for sports such as Australian rules football and cricket.

The Motorplex actually brought drag racing some 45 km closer to Perth than Ravenswood, while for speedway fans the Motorplex saw the sport leave the city and move 26 km south.

Speedway
It also hosts various Western Australian state championship meetings.

On the inside of the main speedway track is a  Motorcycle speedway track that is rarely for anything other than staging for race cars before events and for demolition derbies.

Bikes generally run at the  Pinjar Park Speedway located north of Perth near the Barbagallo Raceway. The bike track did host rounds of the 2001, 2002 and 2005 Western Australian Solo Championships.

Drag Racing
In 2021, Australian National Drag Racing Association announced the establishment of an annual Australian Drag Racing Championship series, with ASID as one of five venues across the country to host a round in the inaugural season.

Motorvation
Motorvation, an annual car show in January, presents "supercruises" (display-only parades), elite car exhibitions, drag racing challenges, burnout competitions and a "Miss Motorvation" beauty contest. Vehicle entries are limited to about 600 to enable a strict management regime.
Motorvation was invented by Rob Woodcock and Phil Cockayne who also started Perth City Street Machine Club.

References

External links 
 Australian National Drag Racing Association Sanctioned Tracks
 Perth Motorplex official website
 Perth Motorplex Facebook

Sports venues in Perth, Western Australia
Motorsport venues in Western Australia
Drag racing venues in Australasia
Speedway venues in Australia
Kwinana Beach, Western Australia